Allen Dale June (November 28, 1921 – September 8, 2010) was an American veteran of World War II. June was one of the 29 original Navajo code talkers who served in the United States Marine Corps during the war.

Early life
June was born in Kaibito, Arizona on November 28, 1921, to a Navajo family. June graduated from Tuba City Vocational High School in Tuba City in 1941. Once the United States entered World War II later that year and began recruiting Navajos as code talkers, June hitchhiked to Fort Defiance and Fort Wingate to enlist.

War years
June enlisted in 1941 and became one of the 29 original Navajo code talkers in the U.S. Marines. he served until the end of World War II in 1945, when he was honorably discharged with the rank of sergeant.

After War
June received a bachelor's degree in business administration, accounting and economics from New Mexico Highlands University in 1952. He later also obtained a master's degree in 1975 from the University of Utah.

Congressional Gold Medal
Dale, along with the other original nine Navajo code talkers, received the Congressional Gold Medal on December 21, 2000. In recent years, residents of Longmont, Colorado, raised money to buy June and his third wife, Virginia June, a home when they learned the couple had no permanent place to live.

Death
Allen Dale June died at Presscott Veteran's Hospital in Prescott, Arizona, on September 8, 2010, at the age of 89. June had become ill while on a trip to Arizona from the family's home in Longmont, Colorado. He was buried at a family cemetery in Kaibeto, Arizona. Navajo Nation President Joe Shirley Jr. ordered all flags to be flown at half staff in June's honor.

With June's death in 2010, Lloyd Oliver's death in 2011, and Chester Nez's death on June 4, 2014, none of the original 29 Navajo code talkers are alive.

References

1921 births
2010 deaths
Navajo code talkers
United States Marine Corps personnel of World War II
Military personnel from Arizona
Congressional Gold Medal recipients
New Mexico Highlands University alumni
University of Utah alumni
People from Coconino County, Arizona
People from Longmont, Colorado
20th-century Native Americans
21st-century Native Americans